Parsifal is an 1882 opera by Richard Wagner.

Parsifal may also refer to:

Silent films 
Parsifal (1904 film), directed by Edwin S. Porter
, directed by Mario Caserini
, directed by Mario Caserini

Sound films 
The Evil Forest (Spanish: Parsifal), a 1951 Spanish film directed by Daniel Mangrané
Parsifal, a made-for-television film of the 1981 Bayreuth Festival production, broadcast in 1982, directed by Brian Large
Parsifal (1982 film), directed by Hans-Jürgen Syberberg

Other uses 
Parsifal (book), a 2009 book by Jindřich Pokorný
Parsifal (train), a Paris-Dortmund express train 1957–1997
Parsifal III (yacht)
PARSIFAL Project EU, a European research project on critical financial infrastructure
2095 Parsifal, an asteroid

See also
Percival (disambiguation)